Annan Shawhill was a station on the Solway Junction Railway at Annan in Dumfries and Galloway, Scotland. The station opened for passenger services in 1870. Passenger services were withdrawn in the early 1930s when the cost of maintaining the Solway Viaduct was deemed to high to sustain. Although the line to England was removed, the Scottish part of the branch to Annan Shawhill remained opened for freight until it was finally closed in the 1950s.

History 
The station was opened by the Solway Junction Railway in 1870, a year after the completion of the line. The SJR was then part of the Caledonian Railway before becoming part of the London Midland and Scottish Railway after the Grouping in 1923.

The fate of the line was sealed in 1921 when the wooden railway viaduct across the Solway Firth was closed because it had become too costly to maintain. Its rising cost of repairs and maintenance was due to its susceptibility to damage in winter from floating ice. Falling mineral traffic from the Cumberland Coalfields also made the line through Annan Shawhill uncompetitive and loss making.

In 1931, passenger services were withdrawn when the line south of Annan across the Solway Firth was officially closed. However, the line remained open from Annan to Kirtlebridge for freight traffic until 1955 when it was closed completely. In 1965 the station's surviving goods shed along with the line's trackbed was reused for a waste water pipeline from Chapelcross nuclear power station. The station house at Annan Shawhill is now a private dwelling.

The town of Annan continues to be served by the Annan railway station on the Glasgow South Western Line.

Services

Notes

Citations

Sources 
 
 
 
 
 Railways of the Solway Plain
 Station on navigable O.S. map Route of line crosses open railway line to the east of current station (Start of former Solway Bridge can be seen)

External links
Video footage of the station in 2016
 RAILSCOT on Solway Junction Railway 

Disused railway stations in Dumfries and Galloway
Former Caledonian Railway stations
Railway stations in Great Britain opened in 1870
Railway stations in Great Britain closed in 1917
Railway stations in Great Britain opened in 1919
Railway stations in Great Britain closed in 1931
Annan, Dumfries and Galloway